Heytesbury Pty. Ltd. is the privately owned company of the Holmes à Court family in Western Australia.

Originally called Heytesbury Holdings, the company was formed by Robert Holmes à Court in the 1970s as the holding company of his rapidly expanding financial empire.  After the sale of its interests in Bell Group and Bell Resources in 1988, Heytesbury became a private investment vehicle, acquiring Stoll Moss Theatres and Sherwin Pastoral Co, and investing in companies such as Jaguar Cars, Christie's, Standard Chartered Bank and U.S. Steel.

Following the death of Robert Holmes à Court in 1990, his widow Janet took over the management of Heytesbury.  Over the next decade a number of assets were sold to reduce the company's heavy debts, including the Stoll Moss Group, a number of cattle stations in Northern Australia, and the John Holland Group (which had been purchased after Robert's death).

In 2000, the eldest son, Peter Holmes à Court, elected to sell his one-sixth share of Heytesbury to pursue his own interests. Robert Holmes à Court had died intestate (without a will), leaving his wife one third of the family fortune with the four children getting the other two thirds. The amount Peter received was reported as A$35 million.

Shortly afterwards, in 2000, Paul Holmes à Court, the youngest son of Robert and Janet Holmes à Court, took over the management of Heytesbury. In the same year, Peter Holmes à Court was appointed to the position of chief executive officer of the Australian Agricultural Company (AACo) and was responsible for re-listing AACo on the Australian Stock Exchange. This set Peter up in direct competition with the family, since the primary business of both Heytesbury and AACo was cattle.

In 2008, Paul bought out his other family shareholders and took sole ownership of the company.

Heytesbury now owns a number of large cattle stations in Northern Australia (including Mount Sanford Station and the famous Victoria River Downs), Vasse Felix (Margaret River's first winery) and the thoroughbred stud Heytesbury Stud near Perth, Western Australia.

References

External links
 

Companies based in Perth, Western Australia
Holding companies of Australia